Quickborn-Preis is a literary prize of Germany, which is given for special achievements in the field of Low German language literature or folklore research. First awarded in 1960, it is awarded every two years, and the winner receives a prize of 2000 euros.

Prize winners

1960 – 1984
 1960: 
 1962: Rudolf Kinau
 1964: Alma Rogge
 1966: Albert Mähl
 1970: Wilhelmine Siefkes
 1972: Heinrich Schmidt-Barrien
 1974: Hinrich Kruse
 1976: Theodor Schuster
 1978: Günter Harte
 1980: Heinrich Diers
 1982: Johann Diedrich Bellmann
 1984: Konrad Hansen

Prize winners since 1992  

 1992: Heinrich Kröger
 1994: Friedrich W. Michelsen
 1996: Heinrich Egon Hansen
 1998: Jürgen Schierer
 2000: Hans Timmermann
 2002: Inge Bichel and Ulf Bichel
 2004: Cornelia Nenz
 2006: Volker Holm
 2008: Jürgen Meier
 2010: Heike Müns
 2012: Hartmut Cyriacks and 
 2014: Georg Bühren
 2016: Dieter Andresen
 2018: Karl-Heinz Madauß
 2020: Heinrich Thies

References

German literary awards